Robert Lewis John Ellery  (14 July 1827 – 14 January 1908) was an English-Australian astronomer and public servant who served as Victorian government astronomer for 42 years.

Early life
Ellery was born in Cranleigh, Surrey, England, the son of John Ellery, a surgeon, and his wife Caroline, née Potter. Ellery was educated at the local grammar school and qualified as a medical practitioner, but he had an early interest in astronomy. Friends at Greenwich Observatory encouraged him and he had some access to instruments there.

Career 
Ellery sailed for Victoria in 1851 attracted by the discovery of gold, and is stated to have practised as a physician at Williamstown, Victoria.  If so it could only have been for a very short period, as in 1853 the Victorian government decided to found an astronomical observatory as a service to shipping, whose navigators relied critically on accurate astronomical time for determination of their longitude and appreciated the opportunity to synchronise their chronometers. Ellery had already established a reputation as a astronomer and in July 1853 was put in charge of the facility.
The Victorian government observatory was at first on a very modest scale, being housed in a small two-roomed cottage at Williamstown, and the only instruments were a sextant, an artificial horizon and a marine chronometer. However, by March 1854, a 30-inch transit instrument, a good astronomical clock and a time-ball apparatus had been added, and a few meteorological instruments were also obtained.

Ellery's workload was not heavy, and he also undertook for a time the duties of storekeeper of the marine depot. In 1856 he began a geodetic survey of Victoria which was not completed until 1874. At the beginning of 1858 the government founded another observatory known as the magnetic observatory on Flagstaff Hill, West Melbourne, under a distinguished German scientist, Georg von Neumayer, who had applied for a site in the Domain south of the Yarra without success. Both Ellery and Neumayer found that the sites given them were not suitable for their work, but it was not until 1863 that a move was made to the Domain. Edward John White, an able astronomer, was added to Ellery's staff in May 1860, and several valuable catalogues of stars were prepared and published. 
Melbourne Observatory played a crucial role in the 1862 determination of the distance from the earth of the sun, which involved close cooperation between Ellery and E. J. Stone of Greenwich.

In 1868 a new telescope was sent out from England but the results obtained with it were unsatisfactory. Ellery resolved the issues he had with the telescope by applying his mechanical ability to the problems involved.
Ellery had an able assistant in Ebenezer Farie Macgeorge (born 1836), who had been his surveyor in 1867 when he defined the boundary between South Australia and New South Wales, then replaced Albert Le Sueur as his observer, serving from 1870 to 1872. In March 1871 he reported to the Royal Society of Victoria that since Le Sueur's polishing of the Great Melbourne Telescope the chief limitation to observation was the atmosphere, not the instrument.

At the end of 1890, another telescope arrived and Ellery began a new important piece of work, the preparation of the share allotted to Melbourne of the astrographic chart. He retired in 1895 and was succeeded by Pietro Baracchi.

Later life
In addition to his own work Ellery had much to do with educational and scientific bodies. He was one of the founders of the Royal Society of Victoria and its president from 1866 to 1884, became a trustee of the public library, museums and National Gallery of Victoria in 1882, and was also for many years a member of the council of the University of Melbourne. He was interested in the volunteer movement and in 1873 organized the Victorian torpedo corps, afterwards the submarine mining engineers. He was in command until 1889, when he retired with the rank of lieutenant colonel. In 1900, Ellery was elected president of the Australasian Association for the Advancement of Science; he chose as the subject of his address "A Brief History of the Beginnings and Growth of Astronomy in Australasia".  Ellery a keen apiarist and was the first president of the Victorian Beekeepers' Club in 1885, and edited the Australian Beekeepers' Journal.

Early in 1907 Ellery had a paralytic stroke, but recovered well and was in fair health until shortly before his death at Melbourne on 14 January 1908. Ellery wrote many papers for scientific journals some of which were re-issued as pamphlets. Some of the catalogues of stars and other work done under his supervision at the observatory were published, but at the time of his death much remained in manuscript. He was elected a fellow of the Royal Society, London, in 1873, and was created C.M.G. in 1889. He was married twice, to two sisters, daughters of Dr John Shields. He left a widow and a daughter.

Ellery was awarded the Clarke Medal by the Royal Society of New South Wales in 1889. Mount Ellery in Antarctica was named after him in 1886.

References

Bibliography
 
 S. C. B. Gascoigne, 'Ellery, Robert Lewis John (1827 - 1908)', Australian Dictionary of Biography, Volume 4, MUP, 1972, pp 135–137. Retrieved 12 October 2008

External links 
Robert Lewis John Ellery at FamilySearch

1827 births
1908 deaths
19th-century Australian astronomers
Companions of the Order of St Michael and St George
English emigrants to colonial Australia
People from Cranleigh
Fellows of the Royal Society
19th-century Australian public servants
University of Melbourne people